Steve Evets (born Steven Murphy; 26 July 1959) is an English actor and musician, who found fame in the leading role in the 2009 film Looking for Eric.

Personal life
Born in Salford, Lancashire, Evets joined the Merchant Navy after leaving school, but was kicked out after three years, after jumping ship twice in Japan and spending his eighteenth birthday in a Bombay brothel.

In 1987 Evets was injured in a pub brawl and spent time on a life support machine. He was stabbed through the liver, lung and diaphragm, was glassed in the face and had his throat cut.

Evets briefly worked delivering pipes alongside his acting career, and as an electrician. As there was already a Steve Murphy on the books of Equity, he decided on the palindromic stage name Steve Evets, "The first thing that popped into my head was 'Steve' backwards ... so I put that on the form."

Career
Evets's early acting work included a street theatre company formed with two friends. He moved into theatre work, and had small roles in several television series such as See No Evil: The Moors Murders, Casualty, Life on Mars, The Cops, Shameless, and Emmerdale.

In between acting roles, he worked under the name Adolph Chip-pan, performing political comedy poetry in Manchester. He also worked as a musician, and was introduced to Mark E. Smith of the Fall in the mid-1990s, leading to Evets performing his poetry at some Fall gigs. When Smith found that Evets could play bass guitar, he was drafted into the band in Turkey after previous bassist Jim Watts had been sacked. Evets played in The Fall between 2000 and 2002, before leaving to front his own band, Dr Freak's Padded Cell, which he described as "electronic dance music with sort of very political overtones", even getting Smith to provide guest vocals on one track; Evets made a video for the track and posted it on YouTube, much to the dislike of Smith, ending their friendship.

His first major film role came in 2008, playing a terminally-ill alcoholic who uses a wheelchair opposite Robert Carlyle, in Summer. He followed this with the lead role in Ken Loach's 2009 film, Looking for Eric.

In 2010 to 2014, he appeared as the homeless congregation member Colin in the acclaimed TV series Rev. He played Morty in Vertigo Films' 2012 low-budget horror film The Facility (originally titled Guinea Pigs) directed by Ian Clark. He starred in a music video for Salford-based band Emperor Zero's 2011 song "Man with Red Eyes".

Steve Evets appeared in the first three episodes of the first series of BBC Three zombie drama In the Flesh, but did not return for series 2 due to his character's death.

In 2015, Evets appeared as Jim Smith in the BBC TV series Death in Paradise episode 4.5 and he also appeared as Bertrand in the BBC TV series The Musketeers episode 2.5 "The Return". In February 2016, he appeared in the BBC One drama series Moving On.
From 2019 Steve joined the brilliant cast of Brassic (Sky TV) as a foul mouthed Farmer called Jim. There are currently 4 seasons of Brassic with the fifth being filmed in 2022.

Filmography

References

External links
 

 

1959 births
20th-century English male actors
21st-century English male actors
Living people
British Merchant Navy personnel
Male actors from Salford
English male film actors
English male television actors
English people of Irish descent
The Fall (band) members
Palindromes
Stabbing survivors